Mengciusornis is an extinct genus of basal ornithuromorphs from the Early Cretaceous of China. It contains one species, M. dentatus, remains of which have been found in the Jiufotang Formation. Together with the closely related Schizooura it makes up the family Schizoouridae.

Description 
Mengciusornis is known from a single specimen, IVPP V26275, a well-preserved skeleton with remains of feathers. Unlike its sister genus Schizooura, which was toothless, Mengciusornis possessed large, curved teeth on its premaxillae, similar to those of the distantly related Longipteryx.

Etymology 
The generic name honours the Chinese philosopher Mencius, while the specific epithet is Latin for "toothed".

References 

Prehistoric euornitheans
Aptian genera
Early Cretaceous dinosaurs of Asia
Jiufotang fauna
Fossil taxa described in 2019
Taxa named by Zhou Zhonghe